was a town located in Santō District, Niigata Prefecture, Japan.

As of 2003, the town had an estimated population of 11,766 and a density of 202.30 persons per km2. The total area was 58.16 km2.

On January 1, 2006, Teradomari, along with the city of Tochio, the town of Yoita, and the village of Washima (all from Santō District), was merged into the expanded city of Nagaoka.

Climate

Transportation

Railway
 JR East - Echigo Line
  - 

In addition to this line, Echigo Kotsu Nagaoka Line(:ja:越後交通長岡線) had been operated in the town until 1975.

Highway

Ports
 Teradomari Port
 Sado Kisen Terminal

Local attractions
 Teradomari Fish Market Street
 Teradomari Aquarium(:ja:寺泊水族博物館)

See also

Dissolved municipalities of Niigata Prefecture
Nagaoka, Niigata